Alan Hunt may refer to:

Alan Hunt (academic), British academic
Alan Hunt (politician) (1927–2013), Australian politician
Alan Hunt (English cricketer) (born 1968), English cricketer
Alan Hunt (New Zealand cricketer) (born 1959), New Zealand cricketer
Alan Hunt (speedway rider) (1925–1957), British speedway rider
Alan Hunt (diplomat) (born 1941), former British diplomat
Alan M. Hunt (born 1947), British wildlife artist

See also
Alan Hunte (born 1970), former professional rugby league footballer
Allan Hunt (born 1945), American actor
Allen Hunt (born 1964), American talk radio host
Allen Funt (1914–1999), of Candid Camera fame